National Route 334 is a national highway of Japan connecting Rausu, Hokkaidō and Bihoro, Hokkaidō in Japan, with a total length of 123.3 km (76.62 mi).

References

National highways in Japan
Roads in Hokkaido